Watermael railway station is a railway station in the municipality of Watermael-Boitsfort in Brussels, Belgium operated by SNCB/NMBS. The station is located on the line 161 connecting Brussels to Namur, between the stations of Etterbeek and Boitsfort. It has been painted many times by famous painter Paul Delvaux.

Train services
The station is served by the following service(s):

Brussels RER services (S8) Brussels - Etterbeek - Ottignies - Louvain-le-Neuve
Brussels RER services (S81) Schaarbeek - Brussels-Luxembourg - Etterbeek - Ottignies (weekdays, peak hours only)

References

External links
 

Railway stations in Brussels
Watermael-Boitsfort
Railway stations opened in 1860